Crossocerus quadrimaculatus   is a Palearctic species of solitary wasp.

References

External links
 Images representing Crossocerus quadrimaculatus 

Hymenoptera of Europe
Crabronidae
Insects described in 1793